Camas County High School is a four-year public secondary school in Fairfield, Idaho. The school colors are navy blue and gold and the mascot is a Musher.

Athletics
The Camas County Mushers compete in athletics in IHSAA Class 1A, Division II, the state's classification for its smallest schools. CCHS is a member of the Sawtooth Conference.

The volleyball team won its third consecutive state title in 2011, led by Katelyn Peterson (class of 2012), who played collegiately in the WAC for the Idaho Vandals.

State titles
Girls
 Volleyball (3): fall (1A, Div II) 2009, 2010, 2011  (introduced in 1976)
 Boys  Basketball 1 1973

References

External links

Public high schools in Idaho
Schools in Camas County, Idaho